Burmis is an unincorporated community in southern Alberta in the Municipal District of Pincher Creek No. 9, located  on Highway 3,  southwest of Lethbridge.  Its post office opened in 1915 and closed in 1968. The name "Burmis" is a portmanteau of Burns and Kemmis, the names of two pioneer citizens.

References

Localities in the Municipal District of Pincher Creek No. 9